Andrew Kameel Sawaya (born 30 April 2000) is a Lebanese footballer who plays as a right-back for  club Ahed and the Lebanon national team.

Club career
Born in Dhour El Choueir, Lebanon, Sawaya moved to the United Arab Emirates aged five, where he lived for seven years. During this time, he played for the academy of Al Ain. In 2012, he moved back to Lebanon, playing for the Athletico football academy for five years.

In July 2017, Sawaya joined Nejmeh, initially playing for both the youth and senior teams. He made one appearance in the 2017–18 Lebanese Premier League, on 15 April 2018, as a starter in a 3–1 defeat to Ahed. Sawaya scored against cross-city rivals Ansar in the 2021–22 league season, to help Nejmeh win 1–0.

On 13 June 2022, Sawaya moved to Ahed on a free contract.

International career
Sawaya represented Lebanon internationally at youth level, and was called up to the senior team's training camp ahead of the 2022 FIFA World Cup qualifiers. He made his senior debut on 30 December 2022, in a 1–0 friendly defeat to the United Arab Emirates.

Style of play 
Sawaya initially started out as a forward and winger during his youth career; he later developed into a right-back. He has been likened to former Lebanese international Ali Hamam. Sawaya stated that he drew inspiration from former German international Philipp Lahm.

Career statistics

International

Honours
Nejmeh
 Lebanese FA Cup: 2021–22; runner-up: 2017–18, 2020–21
 Lebanese Elite Cup: 2018, 2021
 Lebanese Super Cup runner-up: 2018, 2021

References

External links

 
 

2000 births
Living people
People from Dhour El Choueir
Lebanese footballers
Association football fullbacks
Al Ain FC players
Athletico SC men's players
Nejmeh SC players
Al Ahed FC players
Lebanese Premier League players
Lebanon youth international footballers
Lebanon international footballers
Lebanese expatriate footballers
Lebanese expatriate sportspeople in the United Arab Emirates
Expatriate footballers in the United Arab Emirates